USS Mary Pope (SP-291) was a United States Navy patrol vessel in commission from 1917 to 1919.

Mary Pope was built as the civilian wooden-hulled motorboat Manitee in 1915 by the Gas Engine and Power Company and the Charles L. Seabury Company at Morris Heights in the Bronx, New York. She later was renamed Madge and then Mary Pope.

The U.S. Navy purchased Mary Pope from her owner, R. W. Bingham, on 7 July 1917 for World War I service as a patrol vessel. She was commissioned on 9 August 1917 as USS Mary Pope (SP-291).

Mary Pope operated on section patrol duties for the rest of World War I.

After the war, Mary Pope was stricken from the Navy List on 31 March 1919 and was put up for sale. She was at Key West, Florida, awaiting sale when she was destroyed by a hurricane on 10 September 1919.

Notes

References

Department of the Navy: Navy History and Heritage Command: Online Library of Selected Images: U.S. Navy Ships: USS Mary Pope (SP-291), 1917-1919. Originally civilian motor boat Mary Pope (1915), which also had the names Manitee and Madge
NavSource Online: Section Patrol Craft Photo Archive: Mary Pope (SP 291)

Patrol vessels of the United States Navy
World War I patrol vessels of the United States
Ships built in Morris Heights, Bronx
1915 ships